The Catalyst Technologies Venture Capital Group was one of the first technology company incubators. It was founded in 1981 in Sunnyvale, California by Atari co-founder Nolan Bushnell and received much assistance from fellow Atari luminary, Al Alcorn. The term Catalyst Group may refer to both the companies spawned by the Group and the people involved.

The Catalyst Group continued to operate throughout the 1980s, with most of the Catalyst Group companies closing by 1986.

Catalyst companies
The Catalyst Group companies included Androbot, Etak, Cumma, Axlon and many more.

Androbot
In addition to his animatronic entertainment at Pizza Time Theatre, Nolan Bushnell was also involved in the 1982 founding of Androbot, Inc, a company that introduced personal robots for entertainment purposes. The company stopped production in 1984.

Axlon
Axlon launched many consumer and consumer electronic products successfully, most notably AG Bear, a bear that mumbled/echoed a child's words back to him/her. Axlon was largely sold to Hasbro.

Among the key Axlon staff during this period were Nolan Bushnell, Tim Leary, Tom Zito, Jim Simmons, Andy Filo, Fred Heller, Evelyn Lim and Andy Jones.

Cumma
Cumma was a Catalyst company that created a self-serve kiosk and reprogrammable video game cartridges.  The intent was that a video game user - even a child - could use the kiosk to load a new game for $5–$10 via the kiosk, rather than buy a full new cartridge for a game that may have a short practical play life. Cumma launched with great fanfare at the Consumer Electronics Show in 1984, but ultimately did not come to market.

Etak
Etak was the first company to digitize the maps of the world, ultimately providing the backbone for Google Maps, MapQuest, and other navigation systems. In addition to digitizing maps, the company also developed and sold the first in-car navigation system using augmented dead reckoning.  The initial systems had a 6" diagonal green screen, a digital compass installed in the headliner, speed sensors installed in each of the two front wheels to determine speed. Lastly, a cassette deck, which was typically installed under the driver's seat with the digital maps used to interact with the system. This system worked very much like those of sailors before the existence of GPS receivers.  The system required 3 tapes to cover the Northern California's Bay Area. Etak was sold to Rupert Murdoch in the 1980s.

References

Slater, Robert.  Portraits in Silicon, 1989

 Fast Company magazine, 02-17-2017 - The Untold Story of Atari Founder Nolan Bushnell’s Visionary 1980s Tech Incubator 

Financial services companies established in 1981
Venture capital firms of the United States
Companies based in Sunnyvale, California